Walls is a surname. Notable people with the surname include:

In arts and entertainment
Bob Walls (born 1927), New Zealand painter
Brad Walls (born 1992), Australian aerial photographer
Charlotte Fowler Wells (1814-1901), American phrenologist and publisher
David Leslie Walls (born 1964), birthname of English rock musician Ginger Wildheart
Frank Walls (illustrator) (born 1973), American illustrator
Horace Walls III (born 2001), American rapper professionally known as Nardo Wick
Jeannette Walls (born 1960), American writer
Martin Walls (born 1970), British-American poet
Nancy Carell (née Walls; born 1966), American actress, comedian, and writer
Sinqua Walls (born 1985), American actor and basketball player
Tom Walls (born 1883), English actor
Winston Walls, American jazz musician

In government, law, and military
Jim Walls, American police officer
Josiah T. Walls (1842–1905), American politician
Peter Walls (born 1927), Rhodesian military officer
Richard Walls (born 1937), New Zealand politician
William H. Walls (1932–2019), American judge

In science and academia
Daniel Frank Walls (born 1942), New Zealand physicist
David Walls (academic) (born 1941), American academic
Gordon Lynn Walls (1905–1962), American biologist
Laura Walls, American professor of English literature

In sport

American football
Bill Walls (born 1914), American football player
Craig Walls (born 1958), American football player
Darrin Walls (born 1988), American football player
Everson Walls (born 1959), former NFL player
Gavin Walls (born 1980), American football player
Herkie Walls (born 1961), American arena football player
Lenny Walls (born 1979), American football player
Raymond Walls (born 1979), American football player
Wesley Walls (born 1966), American football player
Will Walls (1912–1993), American football player

Other sports
James Walls (born 1892), Scottish footballer
Jaquay Walls (born 1978), American basketball player
Lee Walls (born 1933), baseball player
Mickey Walls (born 1974), Canadian jockey
Moira Walls (born 1952), Scottish high jumper
Rab Walls (1908–1992), Scottish footballer
Robert Walls (born 1950), Australian footballer, coach and commentator
Sinqua Walls (born 1985), American actor and basketball player
Taylor Walls (born 1996), American baseball player
Tony Walls (born 1990), American soccer player

In other fields
Andrew Walls, British theologian
William Walls (1819–1893), Scottish lawyer, industrialist and Glasgow Dean of Guild

See also
Wall (surname)
Walls (disambiguation)